The Citadel Bulldogs football program represents The Citadel in the NCAA Division I Football Championship Subdivision (FCS). The Bulldogs play in the Southern Conference, as they have since 1936.  The Bulldogs are coached by Maurice Drayton, who was hired on January 12, 2023, to replace Brent Thompson, whose contract was not renewed.

History

Facilities
The Bulldogs first recorded stadium was College Park, located in the northeast corner of Hampton Park in Charleston, South Carolina. This field predated the current College Park at the same site, which is used as a practice facility for The Citadel Bulldogs baseball. Due to increasing attendance and the poor state of the stadium, the Bulldogs moved to the original Johnson Hagood Stadium in 1927. In 1948, that stadium was replaced by the current Johnson Hagood Stadium, which lies just to the south of The Citadel's gates in Charleston.

Johnson Hagood is a 21,000-seat stadium, in which The Citadel routinely ranks in the top 25 in attendance at the FCS level.  In 2001, the Altman Athletic Center opened in the south end zone, complete with new home and visitor's locker rooms, official's locker rooms, and an upstairs hospitality area for donors.  In 2008, The Citadel completed a re-construction of the west stands and West Side Tower.  The stands contain reserved premium seats and bleacher seats, while the tower, shared with the South Carolina National Guard, contains twelve suites, a club level, and state of the art press box.  During preparation for construction, workers discovered the remains of sailors from failed test runs of the H.L. Hunley.  These remains were reinterred in Magnolia Cemetery in Charleston.

Beginning in 2012, The Citadel implemented a points system for parking and seat selection in Johnson Hagood Stadium, joining many large programs who use similar systems. The program is designed to reward long-time and large donors to The Citadel athletics by giving them preference in selecting seat and parking locations.

In 2016, The Citadel determined that lead paint needed remediation on the east (visitor's) side of the stadium.  The work resulted in the entire east side being closed for the first game of the 2016 season and some sections being opened for subsequent games.  The capacity was thus 10,500 for the first game and about 15,000 for later games.  The Board of Visitors decided to fully renovate the east side of the stadium, announcing that decision on December 2, 2016.

Practice and on-campus facilities
Practices are held at the Maybank Triplets Practice Facility, an artificial turf field at the north edge of campus.  The Bulldogs utilize Seignious Hall, located across from McAlister Field House for weightlifting, locker rooms, team meeting and video space, and academic tutoring.  The Citadel Sports Medicine Department also utilizes Seignious Hall.

Coaches and staff
Coaches from The Citadel have often been targeted for larger programs. Former head and assistant coaches at The Citadel include Bobby Ross, Charlie Taaffe, Ellis Johnson, Frank Beamer, Al Davis, Ralph Friedgen, and Mike Houston.

Head coaches

Seasons and results

Conference championships
The Citadel has won four conference championships, three outright and one shared.

† denotes co–champions

Postseason appearances

Bowl games

FCS playoffs
The Citadel has appeared in the NCAA Division I Football Championship playoffs five times, posting a 2–5 record.

Rivalries

The Citadel's primary rivals are the VMI Keydets football and Furman Paladins football.  The game with VMI is known as the Military Classic of the South.  The Citadel and Furman have been heated, annual rivals since both joined the Southern Conference in 1936.  The Citadel is 151-174-9 all-time against in-state opponents.

Record vs. Current SoCon opponents
Excludes Furman and VMI, listed above.
East Tennessee State returned to the SoCon in 2016.

Record vs instate opponents
Division 1, non-SoCon only

Bulldogs in professional football

Many Citadel alumni have played in various professional leagues, including the National Football League, Canadian Football League and Arena Football League.  Sixteen players have been drafted in the NFL Draft and AFL Draft, and other players have signed as undrafted free agents.  Likely the most famous Citadel alumni in professional football are Running Back Stump Mitchell and broadcaster Paul Maguire.  Currently, Andre Roberts is a member of the Buffalo Bills and Cortez Allen recently played with the Pittsburgh Steelers for 5 seasons; Running Back Travis Jervey played in 2 Super Bowls with the Green Bay Packers and was named an All Pro as a special teams player.

NFL Draft

AFL Draft

Individual honors

All-Americans
This list includes selected First Team All-Americans at The Citadel

Honored jerseys
Numbers has not been retired and remain active

Future non-conference opponents 
Announced schedules as of December 12, 2022.

References

External links
 

 
Citadel football
Citadel football